Radio 105 is an Italian private radio station, owned by Mediaset, who also owns Virgin Radio Italia and Radio Monte Carlo. It was founded on 1976 as Radio Studio 105.

External links
 Radio 105 Network Official Website 
 Radio 105 Network on YouTube 
 Radio 105 | ALL LIVE RADIO 

Radio stations in Italy
Radio stations established in 1976
RCS MediaGroup
Mass media in Milan